The 2010 Uzbek League season was the 19th season of top-level football in Uzbekistan since independence in 1992.

Bunyodkor were the defending champions from the 2009 campaign.

Teams

League Re-structure 

Only 14 clubs are in the fray this year without the two relegated sides of Sogdiana and Bukhara.

No club has been promoted to the top-flight this season as the reserves of Bunyodkor and Mashal, who are already in the first division, won the second division titles.

Stadia and locations

Personnel and kits

Managerial changes

Pre-season transfers

Final standings

Results

Season statistics

Top goalscorers 

Last updated: 31 October 2010

Disciplinary 
The Disciplinary List as of October 31, 2010:

Top players 
Top players according to statistics and performance in the 2010

Goalkeepers
  Ignatiy Nesterov (Bunyodkor)
  Mikhail Alavidze (Shurtan Guzar)
  Denis Romanenco (Dinamo)

Left backs
  David Oniya (Dinamo)
  Ilhom Suyunov (Pakhtakor)
  Andriy Erokhin (Qizilqum)

Left-centre backs
  Bojan Miladinović (Pakhtakor)
  Yaroslav Krushelnitskiy (Shurtan Guzar)
  Aleksandr Polovkov (Navbahor/Andijan)

Right-centre backs
  Asror Aliqulov (Shurtan Guzar)
  Maksud Karimov (Nasaf Qarshi)
  Kamoliddin Tajiev (Pakhtakor)

Right backs
  Shavkat Mullajanov (Olmaliq FK)
  Umid Tojimov (Metallurg Bekabad)
  Mirjalol Qurbonov (Xorazm FK)

Defensive midfielders
  Viktor Karpenko (Bunyodkor)
  Jahongir Jiyamuradov (Nasaf Qarshi)
  Karim Izrailov (Mash'al/Andijan)

Left wingers
  Shuhrat Mirkholdirshoev (FK Andijan)
  Stanislav Andreev (Pakhtakor)
  Yevhen Saiko (Navbahor)

Central midfielders
  Odil Ahmedov (Pakhtakor)
  Vadim Afonin (Shurtan)
  Andriy Jakovlev (Nasaf Qarshi)

Right wingers
  Aziz Alijonov (Neftchi Farg'ona)
  Kakha Makharadze (Lokomotiv Tashkent)
  Igor Petković (Mash'al)

Left forwards
  Shakhboz Erkinov (Shurtan Guzar)
  Aleksandr Geynrikh (Pakhtakor)
  Nikolay Ryndyuk (Mash'al)
Right forwards

  Kamoliddin Murzoev (Nasaf Qarshi)
  Zokhid Abdullaev (Metallurg Bekabad)
  Patrick Agboh (Shurtan Guzar)

References

External links 
 2010 Uzbek League at Soccerway

Uzbekistan Super League seasons
1
Uzbek
Uzbek